The 2021 Baylor Bears football team represented Baylor University during the 2021 NCAA Division I FBS football season. The Bears played their home games at McLane Stadium in Waco, Texas, and competed in the Big 12 Conference. The team was coached by second-year head coach Dave Aranda.

Previous season

The Bears finished the 2020 regular season with a record of 2–7, to finish ninth in the conference. They were not eligible to play in the post season. The offensive coordinator Larry Fedora left the program at the end of the season and was replaced by Jeff Grimes.

Offseason

Position key

Offseason departures
12 seniors from the 2020 team graduated. No players declared early for the NFL Draft.

Recruiting

2021 NFL Draft

NFL Combine

Team players drafted into the NFL

Preseason

Big 12 media poll

Spring game
The Bears held spring practices in March and April 2021. The Baylor football spring "Green and Gold game" took place in Waco, TX on April 24, 2021.

Schedule 

Schedule Source:

Personnel

Roster

Coaching staff

‡ On November 8, 2021 and during the middle of the 2021 college football season, Joey McGuire was hired by Texas Tech University to replace the recently fired Matt Wells as the Red Raiders' next head football coach. As such, McGuire departed the Baylor Bears' 2021 football staff immediately and did not finish the season with the Bears.

ƒ Collins was promoted in November 2021 to replace Joey McGuire as the Bears' OLB coach.

Game summaries

at Texas State

vs. Texas Southern

at Kansas

vs. No. 14 Iowa State

at No. 19 Oklahoma State

vs. West Virginia

vs. No. 19 BYU

vs. Texas

at TCU

vs. No. 8 Oklahoma

at Kansas State

vs. Texas Tech

vs. Oklahoma State (Big 12 Championship)

vs. Ole Miss (Sugar Bowl)

Rankings

References

Baylor
Baylor Bears football seasons
Big 12 Conference football champion seasons
Sugar Bowl champion seasons
Baylor Bears football